Anneville-en-Saire is a commune in the Manche department of the Normandy region in northwestern France.

Population

Heraldry

See also
Communes of the Manche department

References

Communes of Manche